Lake Reno is a lake in the U.S. state of Minnesota.

Lake Reno was named for Jesse L. Reno (1823–1862), an American military general during the Mexican–American War, and the American Civil War.

See also
List of lakes in Minnesota

References

Lakes of Minnesota
Lakes of Douglas County, Minnesota
Lakes of Pope County, Minnesota